Robert Herbert Carlin (October 27, 1887 – September 4, 1953) was a Canadian politician. He served in the Legislative Assembly of New Brunswick as member of the Liberal party from 1948 to 1952.

References

1887 births
1953 deaths
20th-century Canadian legislators
20th-century Canadian businesspeople
Businesspeople from Saint John, New Brunswick
New Brunswick Liberal Association MLAs